Church of St. Stefan Štiljanović in Karanac is Serbian Orthodox church in eastern Croatia. The church is dedicated to St. Stefan Štiljanović.

See also
Eparchy of Osječko polje and Baranja
Karanac
Serbs of Croatia
List of Serbian Orthodox churches in Croatia

References

Karanac